Knisely is a surname. Notable people with the surname include:

Mary Knisely (born 1959), American middle- and long-distance runner
Matthew Knisely (born 1974), American photojournalist
Nicholas Knisely (born 1960), American bishop
Pete Knisely (1887–1948), American baseball player